Lower Chinook is a Chinookan language spoken at the mouth of the Columbia River on the west coast of North America.

Dialects
 Clatsop (Tlatsop) was spoken in northwestern Oregon around the mouth of the Columbia River and the Clatsop Plains (†).
 Chinook Jargon
 Shoalwater (also known as Chinook proper), extinct (†) since the 1930s.  Shoalwater was spoken in southwestern Washington around southern Willapa Bay.

References

 Chinook (Tsinúk) at Omniglot. Retrieved 2017-06-23

Chinookan languages
Indigenous languages of Oregon
Indigenous languages of the Pacific Northwest Coast